Lithuania competed at the 2018 Summer Youth Olympics, in Buenos Aires, Argentina from 6 October to 18 October 2018.

Athletics

 Boys shot put - Dominykas Čepys
 Boys Discus Throw - Matas Makaravičius
 Boys 110 m Hurdles - Dovidas Petkevičius

Gymnastics

Artistic
Lithuania qualified one gymnast based on its performance at the 2018 European Junior Championship.

 Girls' artistic individual all-around - Eglė Stalinkevičiutė

Modern pentathlon

 Elžbieta Adomaitytė
 Aivaras Kazlas

Rowing

Lithuania qualified one boat based on its performance at the 2017 World Rowing Junior Championships.

Qualification Legend: FA=Final A (medal); FB=Final B (non-medal); FC=Final C (non-medal); FD=Final D (non-medal); SA/B=Semifinals A/B; SC/D=Semifinals C/D; R=Repechage

Shooting

 Greta Rankelytė - Girls 10m Air Pistol

Individual

Team

Swimming

 Kotryna Teterevkova
 Agnė Šeleikaitė
 Alanas Tautkus
 Arijus Pavlidi

Table tennis

Lithuania qualified one table tennis player based on its performance at the European Continental Qualifier.

 Boys' singles - Medardas Stankevičius

Weightlifting

References

2018 in Lithuanian sport
Nations at the 2018 Summer Youth Olympics
Lithuania at the Youth Olympics